The European Network of Democratic Young Left (ENDYL) was an independent network of left-wing democratic socialist political youth organisations in Europe.

ENDYL was open to European youth organisations of the democratic left that neither follow a social democratic nor an uncritically orthodox communist course. Its agenda was based on democracy, individual freedom, solidarity, human rights, internationalism and ecological responsibility.

Founded in Copenhagen, 6 to 8 May 1994, ENDYL consisted of 17 socialist, green left and radical democratic youth organisations in 2012. It worked together with the Party of the European Left as well as with social movements and with organisations from the countries of the southern hemisphere.

In March 2016 ENDYL announced its dissolution. Some of its member are participating in the formation of the Young European Left as its successor.

Members

  — Socialistisk UngdomsFront
  — Estonian Left Party Youth
  — Vasemmistonuoret
  — Jeunes Communistes
  — Linksjugend ['solid]
  — JungdemokratInnen/Junge Linke
  — SYRIZA Youth
  — Sinn Féin Republican Youth
  — Young Left Green
  — Young Communists
  — Young Socialists of Macedonia
  — Union of the Communist Youth of Moldova (Komsomol)
  — Sosialistisk Ungdom
  — Młodzi Razem
  — Bloco de Esquerda
  — Izquierda Unida, Alternativa Jove
  — Özgürlük ve Dayanışma Partisi

Board of ENDYL 2010-2011

Toivo Haimi — Vasemmistonuoret
Alexandr Roshko — Union of the Communist Youth of Moldova
Naum Stojcevski - Young Socialists of Macedonia
Nefeli Samiakou - Νεολαία Συνασπισμού / Neolaia Synaspismou
Daniel Kaszubowski — Młodzi Socjaliści

Board of ENDYL 2012

Alexandr Roshko — Union of the Communist Youth of Moldova
Naum Stojcevski - Young Socialists of Macedonia
Dimitris Karamanis - Νεολαία Συνασπισμού / Neolaia Synaspismou
Simone Oggionni — Young Communists

References

External links
 
  

Youth wings of pan-European political parties
Youth organizations established in 1994